Rudolf Brinkmann (28 August 1893, Greene, Einbeck – after 1973) was a German economist and Secretary of State in the time of Nazism.

After he had finished school, Brinkmann studied legal science and economics. After the outbreak of the first World War he joined German army and served as an artillerist. 1916 he left the army because of an injury. He moved to banks and worked since 1919 in Göttingen for the Reichsbank. 1923 he overtook the guidance of intern revision of the Reichsbank in Berlin and worked later in the directory. Afterwards he was member of board of ReichsbankHamburg. 1931 he became director of the Reichsbank in Aschaffenburg.

Period of Nazism
After the transfer of power to the Nazis he was in spring of 1933, board member at the German Golddiskontbank and 1937 at the Reichsbank

In Ministry of Economic Affairs Brinkmann in 1934 initially was working under the new Minister Hjalmar Schacht as a general officer and was promoted there in 1938 to the State Council. In early February 1938, he was appointed the Reich Economics Ministry State Secretary. From 1938 to 1939 he was also on the board of the Hermann Göring Reichswerke. From January 1939 Brinkmann was briefly vice president of the Reichsbank (. SS No. 308 241) and received in November 1938 to the rank of Oberführer Whether he became in 1939 a member of NSDAP is unsecure. Brinkmann was a board member of the VEW and Bank for International Settlements.

Mid February 1939 Brinkmann was on leave due to illness and placed into pending status. In May 1939, due to the duration of his illness, Brinkmann was evidently acute manic-depressive illness, what has been described as "severe nervous breakdown" he was then admitted to a mental hospital in Bonn, where he remained until the end of World War II in a closed hospital. As State Secretary in the Ministry of Economics followed him afterFriedrich Landfriedstraße and as vice president of the Reichsbank Emil Puhl.

References

External links
 

1893 births
Date of death unknown
German bankers
German economists
German people of World War I
German politicians
Officials of Nazi Germany
People from Einbeck
SS personnel